Phou-oibi, the Rice Goddess  is a 2013 Meitei language ballad opera, based on the story of goddess Phouoibi, adapted from Meitei mythology and folklore, performed by the Laihui Ensemble from Manipur, India, as a part of the "Tapestry of Sacred Music 2013" programme, held at the Esplanade in Singapore.

Plot 
The ballad opera "Phou-oibi, the Rice Goddess" tells the divine narratives of different goddesses, associated with fish, land, metal, water, wealth and after all of rice, goddess Phouoibi, who are sent down to earth by the Supreme God to prosper the human civilization. On her way, Phouoibi meets Akongjamba in the ancient kingdom of Moirang and both fall in love with each other.

See also 
 Music of Manipur
 Nura Pakhang (Eu e Tu)
 Shakuhachi meets Pena

References

External links 

 
 
 
 Phou-Oibi, the Rice Goddess by Laihui Ensemble
  
 
 

Operas
Phouoibi
Meitei folklore in popular culture
Meitei mythology in popular culture
Epic cycles of incarnations